Safari is a 2016 Austrian-Danish documentary film co-written and directed by  Ulrich Seidl. It premiered out of competition at the 73rd edition of the Venice Film Festival, and was later screened at the 41st Toronto International Film Festival. It is an explicit portrayal of the tourist hunting in Africa.

References

External links  
 
Review of Safari on The Seventh Art

2016 documentary films
Austrian documentary films
Danish documentary films
Films directed by Ulrich Seidl
Documentary films about Africa
Films about hunters